HD 89345 b is a Neptune-like exoplanet that orbits a G-type star. It is also called K2-234b. Its mass is 35.7 Earths, it takes 11.8 days to complete one orbit of its star, and is 0.105 AU from its star. It was discovered by 43 astrophysicists, one which is V. Van Eylen, and is announced in 2018.

Overview 
The exoplanet HD 89345 b, which has a mass of 0.1 MJ and a radius of 0.61 RJ, was assigned to the class of ocean planets. The parent planet star of about 5.3 billion years old belongs to the spectral class G5V-G6V; it is 66 percent larger and 22 percent more massive than the Sun, and is 413 light-years away. The effective temperature of the star is 5609 Kelvin, and considering that HD 89345 b makes one revolution around the star in 11.8 days, being from it at a distance of 0.11 astronomical unit, This planet was described by researchers as a warm subterranean with an equilibrium temperature of 1059 Kelvin.

Discovery 
HD 89345 b, the Saturn-sized exoplanet orbiting a slightly evolved star HD 89345, was discovered in 2018 using the transit photometry method, the process in which detects distant planets by measuring the minute dimming of a star as an orbiting planet passes between it and the Earth. It is the only planet orbiting around HD 89345, a G5 class star, situated in the constellation of Leo in 413 light-years from the Sun. This star is aged 9.4 billion years. HD 89345 b orbits its star in about 12 terrestrial days on an elliptical orbit. The orbit is closer to the star than the internal limit of the habitable zone. It has a low density and can be composed of gas.

Its parent star, HD 89345, is a bright star observed by the K2 mission with one-minute time sampling. It exhibits solar-like oscillations. The data is conducted by asteroseismology to be able to determine the parameters of the star and find its mass and radius. Its mass is  M⊕� and its mean radius is  R⊕�. The star appears to have recently left the main sequence, based on the inferred age,  Gyr, and the non-detection of mixed modes. The star hosts a "warm Saturn". The data also show that the planet's orbit is eccentric.

See also 

 List of potentially habitable exoplanets
 List of exoplanet firsts
 List of exoplanetary host stars
 List of exoplanets discovered using the Kepler spacecraft
 List of planets observed during Kepler's K2 mission
 List of nearest terrestrial exoplanet candidates

References 

Transiting exoplanets
Exoplanets discovered in 2018
Leo (constellation)